Without Anesthesia (alternative English title: Rough Treatment) is the English-language title for the Polish film Bez znieczulenia, released in 1978, directed by Andrzej Wajda. It was entered in the 1979 Cannes Film Festival.

According to the screenplay, Without Anesthesia takes place in the 1960s. Jerzy (Zbigniew Zapasiewicz), a well-known journalist and foreign correspondent who reports on wars, revolutions and guerrilla movements in the third world, is a man whose personal life and career are falling apart.

The main character is based on Ryszard Kapuściński, the prominent Polish journalist and author of the "reportage" school.

Cast
 Zbigniew Zapasiewicz - Jerzy Michalowski
 Ewa Dalkowska - Ewa Michalowska
 Andrzej Seweryn - Jerzy Rosciszewski
 Krystyna Janda - Agata
 Emilia Krakowska - Wanda Jakowicz
 Roman Wilhelmi - Bronski
 Kazimierz Kaczor - Editor-in-chief
 Iga Mayr - Ewa's Mother
 Aleksandra Jasienska - Olenka
 Maria Salinger - Gabcia
 Stefania Iwinska - Józefa
 Halina Golanko - Halina Lukasik
 Jerzy Stuhr - Jerzy Porebowicz
 Magda Teresa Wójcik - Joanna Cichon
 Danuta Balicka-Satanowska - Judge

See also 
Cinema of Poland
List of Polish language films

References

External links

1978 films
1970s Polish-language films
Films directed by Andrzej Wajda
1978 drama films
Polish drama films